Marquette is an inter-species hybrid red wine grape variety. It was developed at the University of Minnesota as part of its grape breeding program (which seeks to develop high quality, cold hardy, and disease resistant wine and table grape cultivars), and is a cross between two other hybrids, MN 1094 and Ravat 262. Marquette was introduced in 2006 and has good resistance to downy mildew, powdery mildew, and black rot, as well as being cold hardy (will survive -37 C when fully dormant).

In August 2019, VQA Ontario announced that the province of Ontario's VQA regulations have added Marquette to the list of permitted grape varieties for Ontario wines branded as VQA.  The grape is grown in the Thompson Valley, BC region but is not yet on the official BC VQA list.

Synonyms 
Marquette is also known under its breeding code Minnesota 1211 (MN 1211).

See also

Frontenac (grape), another hybrid from the University of Minnesota

References 

Hybrid grape varieties